Henry Balink (1882–1963) was a Dutch-born American painter, draughtsman and etcher from Santa Fe, New Mexico. Born in Amsterdam, he was trained at the Royal Netherlands Academy of Arts and Sciences and emigrated to the United States. He first lived in Taos, New Mexico, in 1917 and settled in Santa Fe in 1924. Balink painted portraits of Native Americans. His work was exhibited at the New Mexico Museum of Art as early as 1917, and later at the Tucson Museum of Art. It is in the collections of the Kansas City Art Institute and the Gilcrease Museum.

References

1882 births
1963 deaths
Artists from Amsterdam
People from Santa Fe, New Mexico
Dutch emigrants to the United States
Painters from New Mexico
20th-century American painters
American male painters
American etchers
20th-century American male artists